Donald Jasper Harris (born August 23, 1938) is a Jamaican-American economist and professor emeritus at Stanford University, known for applying post-Keynesian ideas to development economics. He is the father of the 49th and current vice president of the United States, Kamala Harris, as well as of her sister, lawyer and political commentator Maya Harris.

Throughout his career, Harris has worked on economic analysis and policy regarding the economy of Jamaica, his native country. He served there, at various times, as economic policy consultant to the Government of Jamaica and as economic adviser to successive prime ministers. On October 18, 2021, he was honored with appointment to the Order of Merit, Jamaica's National Honor award, "for his outstanding contribution to national development".

Early life and education 
Donald J. Harris was born in Brown's Town, St. Ann Parish, Jamaica, the son of Beryl Christie Harris (née Finegan) and Oscar Joseph Harris, who were of Afro-Jamaican and Irish-Jamaican heritage. As a child, Harris learned the catechism, was baptized and confirmed in the Anglican Church, and served as an acolyte. According to Harris, the construction of the local Anglican Church was founded by Hamilton Brown, who Harris believes—in accordance with statements made by his grandmother—is his ancestor. He grew up in the Orange Hill area of Saint Ann Parish, near Brown's Town. Harris received his early education at Titchfield High School.

Harris studied at the University College of the West Indies and earned a Bachelor of Arts degree from the University of London in 1960 and a PhD from the University of California, Berkeley in 1966. His doctoral dissertation, Inflation, Capital Accumulation and Economic Growth: A Theoretical and Numerical Analysis, was supervised by econometrician Daniel McFadden.

Career
Harris's economic philosophy was critical of mainstream economics and questioned orthodox assumptions. He was once described as a "Marxist scholar".

Harris was an assistant professor at the University of Illinois at Urbana–Champaign from 1966 to 1967 and at Northwestern University from 1967 to 1968. He moved to the University of Wisconsin–Madison as an associate professor in 1968. In 1972, he joined the faculty of Stanford University as a professor of economics, and became the first Black scholar to be granted tenure in Stanford's Department of Economics. At various times he was a visiting fellow in Cambridge University and Delhi School of Economics; and visiting professor at Yale University. He served on the editorial boards of the Journal of Economic Literature and of Social and Economic Studies. He is a longtime member of the American Economic Association.

Harris directed the Consortium Graduate School of Social Sciences at the University of the West Indies in 1986–1987, and he was a Fulbright Scholar in Brazil in 1990 and 1991, and in Mexico in 1992. In 1998, he retired from Stanford, becoming a professor emeritus.

At Stanford, Harris's doctoral students have included Steven Fazzari, a professor of economics at Washington University in St. Louis, and Robert A. Blecker, a professor of economics at American University in Washington, D.C. He helped to develop the new program in Alternative Approaches to Economic Analysis as a field of graduate study. For many years he also taught the undergraduate course Theory of Capitalist Development. He took early retirement from Stanford in 1998 in order to pursue his interest in developing public policies to promote economic growth and advance social equity.

Contributions to economic analysis and policy 

Harris's research and publications have focused on exploring the process of capital accumulation and its implications for economic growth with the aim of proving that economic inequality and uneven development are inevitable properties of economic growth in a market economy. From this standpoint, he has sought to assess the traditions of economic study inherited from the classical economists and Karl Marx as well as modern contributions while engaging in related economic studies of various countries' experience.

Harris is said to work in the tradition of Post-Keynesian Economics. He has acknowledged the works of Joan Robinson, Maurice Dobb, Piero Sraffa, Michal Kalecki, Karl Marx, John Maynard Keynes, Joseph Schumpeter, and W. Arthur Lewis as influences upon his work.

One of Harris's most notable contributions to economics is his book Capital Accumulation and Income Distribution. In this work, he lays out the familiar linear model of production and exchange where prices are determined as prices of production in the classical manner, subject to given conditions of distribution. He builds on this framework an analysis of growth that exposes the possibility of economic crises arising from various sources related to investment demand, wage determination, profit realization, and labor supply and, from this perspective, offers a critique of alternative approaches to growth theory.

Harris explained that the value measure of capital, as determined by the prices of production of the underlying produced capital goods, is in general not inversely related to the profit rate. He also examined the meaning and limitations of the concept of choice of technique and showed that it is inconsistent with observed features of the process of technological change. 

A major focus of his subsequent research is on the phenomenon of "uneven development", defined as "persistent differences in levels and rates of economic development between different sectors of the economy". His analysis locates the impetus for growth and development in the drive for investment and technological change by individual firms. Sectoral differentiation and inequality of outcomes are shown to arise from the dynamics of adjustment to technological change within and across firms over time. Features of the adjustment process are posited to be consistent with the conception of an evolutionary process.

Harris has done research on the economy of Jamaica, presenting analyses and reports on the structural conditions, historical performance, and contemporary problems of the economy, as well as developing plans and policies for promoting economic growth and social inclusion. Notable outcomes of this effort are the National Industrial Policy promulgated by the Government of Jamaica in 1996 and the Growth Inducement Strategy of 2011.

Books
Harris is the author of the monograph, Capital Accumulation and Income Distribution, published in 1978 by Stanford University Press.

He has also published several books on the economy of Jamaica, including Jamaica's Export Economy: Towards a Strategy of Export-led Growth (Ian Randle Publishers, 1997) and A Growth-Inducement Strategy for Jamaica in the Short and Medium Term (edited with G. Hutchinson, Planning Institute of Jamaica, 2012).

Personal life
Harris arrived at the University of California, Berkeley on the Issa Scholarship (founded and funded by Kingston merchant Elias A.Issa in the 1930s) in the fall of 1961. Later in the fall of 1962, he spoke at a meeting of the Afro-American Association — a students' group at Berkeley. After his talk, he met Shyamala Gopalan (1938–2009), a graduate student in nutrition and endocrinology from India at Cal Berkeley who was in the audience. According to Harris, "We talked then, continued to talk at a subsequent meeting, and at another, and another." In July 1963, he married Gopalan.

Harris and Gopalan had two children: Kamala Harris, former U.S. Senator from California and  vice president of the United States; and Maya Harris, a lawyer and political commentator. The couple divorced when Kamala was either five or seven years old, possibly in December 1971.

The children visited Harris's family in Jamaica as they grew up.

At some time prior to May 2015, Harris became a naturalized U.S. citizen.

References

1938 births
20th-century American economists
Alumni of the University of London
Alumni of University of London Worldwide
American people of Irish descent
Colony of Jamaica people
Harris family
Jamaican economists
Jamaican emigrants to the United States
Living people
Naturalized citizens of the United States
Northwestern University faculty
People from Saint Ann Parish
Stanford University Department of Economics faculty
University of California, Berkeley alumni
University of Illinois faculty
University of Wisconsin–Madison faculty
Fathers of vice presidents of the United States
Post-Keynesian economists
Marxian economists